CB and variants may refer to:

Places
 CB postcode area, British post code for eastern England served by the Cambridge postal sorting office
 Cambodia (FIPS Pub 10-4 country code and obsolete NATO digram CB)
 Cape Breton (disambiguation)
 Centura București, a ring road of Bucharest, Romania
 Colegio Bolivar, an American school in Cali, Colombia
 Colwyn Bay, Wales
 Province of Campobasso, Italy
 ČB – České Budějovice, Czech Republic

People
 Chris Bosh (born 1984), American basketball player
 Henry Campbell-Bannerman (1836–1908), Prime Minister of the United Kingdom 1906–1908, widely referred to by his surname initials

Brands and enterprises
 Carte Bancaire, a bank card brand
 Christianssands Bryggeri, a Norwegian brewery
 ScotAirways (IATA airline code CB)

Business and financial terms
 Capacity building, the process by which individuals and organizations obtain, improve, and retain the skills and knowledge needed to undertake their tasks
 Certification body
 Chargeback, a reversal of a banking or credit card transaction
 Convertible bond, a type of bond that can convert into a specified number of shares

Science and technology

Computing and telecommunications
 Cell Broadcast, in GSM mobile networks
 Citizens band radio (CB radio), a system of short-distance radio communications
 Closed beta, a software development stage or testing process

Other uses in science and technology
 Cannabinoids, a group of substances that bind to animal cannabinoid receptors
 Circuit breaker, an automatic electrical switch designed to protect an electrical circuit from damage caused by overcurrent
 Columbium (Cb), an obsolete name for the element niobium
 Conduction band of the electrons in a (semiconducting) solid
 Confirmation bias
 Cumulonimbus cloud (Cb), a type of cloud that is tall, dense, and involved in thunderstorms and other intense weather

Sea vessels
 CB-class midget submarine, a group of midget submarines built for the Italian Navy during World War II
 Block coefficient (Cb), a parameter describing the shape of a ship's hull
 Large Cruiser, a retired US Navy hull classification (symbol CB)

Sports

Positions
 Centre-back, a defensive position in association football
 Cornerback, a position in American football

Teams
 Chicago Bears, a team in the National Football League
 Chicago Bulls, a team in the National Basketball Association
 Cleveland Browns, a team in the National Football League

Titles
 Chief Baron of the Exchequer, the chief judge of the Court of Exchequer, an abolished English court
 Companion of The Most Honourable Order of the Bath, a title conferred to British and Commonwealth citizens

Other uses
 
 2020 Singapore circuit breaker measures, commonly abbreviated as CB, a stay-at-home order implemented in response to the COVID-19 pandemic in Singapore
 CB, dominical letter for a leap year starting on Friday
 Casus belli, a Latin expression meaning reason for war
 Construction Battalion (CB or "Seabee"), a United States Navy unit responsible for any type of construction be it  general or combat on land or under water.
 Curveball, a music festival hosted by the band Phish
 Cone Beam (especially CBCT; Cone beam computed tomography)
 Cumulative Bulletin, an annual compilation of the Internal Revenue Bulletin